Blackmar is a surname. Notable people with the surname include:

Armand Blackmar (1826–1888), American music publisher
Charles Blakey Blackmar (1922–2007), American judge
Elizabeth Blackmar, American historian, author, and professor
Esbon Blackmar (1805–1857), American politician
Frank W. Blackmar (1854–1931), American sociologist, historian and educator
Phil Blackmar (born 1957), American golfer
Wilmon W. Blackmar (1841–1905), Union Army officer and Medal of Honor recipient